The East and the West or Prachya o Paschatya is a book written by Swami Vivekananda. In this book Swami Vivekananda made a comparative study of eastern and Western cultures.

Synopsis 
The book is divided into six chapters (excluding introduction).
 Introduction
 Customs: Eastern and Western
 Food and cooking
 Civilisation in dress
 Etiquette and manners
 France — Paris
 Progress in Civilisation
Vivekananda told the culture, the social customs of India is quite different from the Western countries. He claimed that religion (dharma) is the foundation of India.

Publication 
This writing was first published in 1900–01 in the magazine Udbodhan in two different issues. Later in 1909, the writing was published as a book by the Vedanta Society in New York City.

References 

Works by Swami Vivekananda
1909 non-fiction books
Classic yoga books